Lamkang is a Tibeto-Burman language of Southern Naga linguistic sub branch. It is spoken by the Lamkang Nagas of Manipur, India, with one village in Burma. The Lamkangs mostly live in the southwest and southeastern parts of Manipur.

Background
The language has been influenced by Manipur's state language, Meitei (Manipuri) as the people have been in contact with Meiteis, and as Meitei (Manipuri) is used as a lingua franca among local tribes. There are current language documentation efforts by native speakers including Bible translations by Mr. Swamy Tholung Ksen under the Bibles International, Pautum Ren (New Testament) the collection of traditional stories songs (done by Beshot Khullar) Children's story book Knao Bu Then, Naoluwng Paomin, published by SIL, and the Universal Declaration Of Human Rights (UDHR) and United Nations Declaration on the Rights of Indigenous Peoples (UNDRIP) translated by Sumshot Khular, and videography of traditional dances and stories (done by the Rev. Daniel Tholung) and work on creating a standard orthography (by the Lamkang Literature and Education Committee).

Geographical distribution
Lamkang is spoken in the following locations (Ethnologue).

Chandel district, southwestern and southeastern Manipur
 7 villages to the west and east of Sugunu, Keithelmanbi, Chayang, Purum Pantha, Leingangching, Nungkangching, Komsen, Kurnuching
 7 villages between Challong and Mombi New, Kongpe, Angbrasu, Challong, Paraolon, Lungkharlon, M.Seljol, Khuutun
 c. 20 villages between Pallel, Chandel town
Thamlakhuren, Thamlapokpi (Damloonkhuupii), Leipungtampak (Rindamkhuu), Laiktla, Ksen Khuupii, Lamkang Khunthak, New Lamkang Khunthak, Sektaikarong, Lamkang Khunou (Wangjangloon), Mantri Pantha, Damjool, Aibuldaam, Ringkhuu, P.RaalRingkhuu, Angkhel Chayang, Deeringkhuu, Daampii, Khuutii, Charancghing Khunkha, Chanrangching khunou,Lamrinkhuu, SS. Morhring khuu, Tsuu Loon,
Nagaland: Kohima and Dimapur-Lamkang Colony

References

Southern Naga languages
Languages of Nagaland
Languages of Manipur